This article is List of awards and nominations received by Iranian director and screenwriter Ebrahim Hatamikia.

Hatamikia has received several awards and honors through his career including 23 nominations for Crystal Simorgh which won 10 of them. The Bodyguard (2016) is the most nominated and most awarded film of him. His first was for The Path (1985), a short film which produced at early stages of his professional career. In addition to awards and nominations for directing and screenwriting, he has nominated for Best Supporting Actor at the 6th Iran's Film Critics and Writers Association Awards.

Awards and nominations

Most awards and nominations

Notes

References

External links 
 List of awards and nominations at Filcin (in Persian)

awards
Lists of awards received by film director